Houston We Have No Problem is the fourth album by Nottingham-based project Twelve and is part one of a two-part set. This album was released as download only via www.sixbyseven.co.uk. Part two, Raumschiff Schlaf Symphonie, was released on cd only.
Houston We Have No Problem is the story of an astronaut lost in space. Follow his journey as he attempts to survive and return to earth.

Track listing

 "A Bridge Across the Clouds"
 "Cosmic Tears"
 "Astral Works"
 "North Light"
 "The Sun"
 "Eclipse"
 "Heaven Ascent"
 "Water"
 "At the Ends Of the Worlds"
 "Orchid"
 "Oxygen Starvation"
 "Talk To Me"
 "Saturn"
 "Space Dreams"

Catalogue Numbers
Saturday Night Sunday Morning Records snsm

External links
Twelve:03 Press Release
Official Twelve Page
Chris Olley's web site
Twelve's MySpace page

Chris Olley albums
2008 albums